Marcel-Marie Desmarais, (April 6, 1908, Montreal – July 16, 1994, Montreal), was a Quebec writer, preacher and broadcaster.  A member of the Roman Catholic Dominican Order, he became a personality through his popular books and radio and TV programs (CKAC et Radio-Canada) in Quebec. He was also sent as missionary to Brazil during the 1940s.

In 1986 Desmarais won the Eugene Piccard Award for The Magic of the Past (La Magie du Passé).

Selected works

References

1908 births
1994 deaths
20th-century Canadian Roman Catholic priests